The She-Wolf (Greek: I lykaina) is a 1951 Greek romantic drama film directed by Maria Plyta and starring Aleka Katselli, Andreas Zisimatos and Anthi Miliadi.

Cast
 Aleka Katselli as Louka  
 Andreas Zisimatos as Alexis  
 Anthi Miliadi 
 Giannis Argyris as Manousos  
 Inta Hristinaki
 Dimos Starenios
 Anna Paitatzi
 Kostis Leivadeas
 Lakis Skellas
 Nina Starenjou
 Yorgos Ploutis
 Sapfo Notara as Taso  
 Evangelos Gatzias 
 Eleftheria Xanthopoulou
 Evangelos Maroulis
 Apostolos Galanopoulos
 Nitza Avantagelou
 Asimina Bairamoglou
 Kostas Doukas
 Ilias Iakovou
 Alexandros Kokkinos
 Pari Kontarini
 Konstadinos Mourat
 Nasos Oikonomopoulos
 Fotis Papalabros
 Yiorgos Stavrakakis
 Malvina Tsougiopoulou 
 Antonis Tsourounakis
 Kiki Vasilikou
 Nana Viopoulou
 Dimitris Vlahopoulos
 Olga Xanthopoulou

References

Bibliography
 Vrasidas Karalis. A History of Greek Cinema. A&C Black, 2012.

External links
 

1951 films
1951 romantic drama films
1950s Greek-language films
Greek romantic drama films
Films directed by Maria Plyta
Greek black-and-white films